In mathematics, the order of a polynomial may refer to:
the degree of a polynomial, that is, the largest exponent (for a univariate polynomial) or the largest sum of exponents (for a multivariate polynomial) in any of its monomials;
the multiplicative order, that is, the number of times the polynomial is divisible by some value;
the order of the polynomial considered as a power series, that is, the degree of its non-zero term of lowest degree; or
the order of a spline, either the degree+1 of the polynomials defining the spline or the number of knot points used to determine it.

See also
Order polynomial
Orders of approximation
Partial differential equation#Classification